This is a list of Labour Co-operative Members of Parliament (MPs) elected to the British House of Commons in the last parliament. The names in italics are the current Speaker and Deputy Speakers and the names with a * next to them are MPs who first entered Parliament in a by-election.

For other Labour Party MPs, see List of United Kingdom Labour MPs 2005-; for a combined list, see List of United Kingdom Labour and Labour Co-operative MPs 2005-.

MPs

See also
 Results of the 2005 United Kingdom general election
 List of MPs elected in the 2005 United Kingdom general election
 List of United Kingdom Labour MPs 2005-
 List of United Kingdom Labour and Labour Co-operative MPs 2005-
 List of United Kingdom Conservative MPs 2005-
 List of United Kingdom Liberal Democrat MPs 2005-
 List of MPs for Scottish constituencies 2005-
 List of MPs for Northern Irish constituencies 2005-
 List of MPs for Welsh constituencies 2005-
 Members of the House of Lords
 :Category:UK MPs 2005-2010

Labour co-operative
Labour Co-operative